Drishtidan (Donating Eyes  )  (1948) is an Indian Bengali feature film directed by Nitin Bose. Legendary actor Uttam Kumar debuted in this film, later who become one of the greatest actor in the Indian Cinema and most popular and successful film star in Bengali Cinema history. In this film Kumar played as a child artist of the hero Asit Baran's role. The film become flopped at the box office despite the story of Rabindranth Tagore.

Plot
Kumudini (Sunanda Banerjee) is being blinded her husband yet her love, affection and sacrifice. Her husband (Asit Baran) is truly unparalleled. Kusum got married at the age of fourteen to a young man studying medicine. Within a year, Kumu fell very ill while giving birth at such a young age and her child died. He is sick but not dying but gradually his eyes develop problems. Her husband was studying medicine at that time. He started treating Kumru's eyes with his clumsy hands. Kumar Bhasur Thakur asked her husband to take special care that Kumar's eyes should not be damaged by treating him in this way.

The two brothers quarreled a lot about this. Kumu knows that her husband is not able to treat her eyes properly but to please him she continues as he says. Kumar Bhasur Thakur secretly wanted to treat him but Kumar refused. Finally trying to save her husband's heart, this young bride becomes blind forever.

Kumu realizes that her husband is responsible for the situation and apologizes to Kumu. She vows that she will never marry again and will have no place in her life for any woman other than her. She expresses hypocritical anger but is extremely happy with her husband. Gradually her husband completed his medical studies and became well known in the medical profession. Her husband started to change gradually as they started to provide a lot of money to their family.

After the quarrel that started between the two brothers over him being blinded, both parties realized their mistake and all the quarrels between the brothers ended. Her husband spends his days happily with Kumu. Kumar's PC mother-in-law wants to remarry Komar Swami with her brother's daughter Hemangi. Gradually he falls in love with Kumura's husband and forgets the promise he once made to her and sets off for marriage. But in the end he can't did it.

Cast
 Sunanda Bannerjee as Kumudini/Kumu
 Asit Baran as Dr Abinash Kumu's husband 
 Uttam Kumar as Young Abinash
 Krishnachandra Dey
 Chhabi Biswas
 Ketaki Dutta as Young Kumu
 Sandhyarani

Soundtrack

References

External links

Bengali-language Indian films
1948 drama films
1948 films
Films directed by Nitin Bose
Indian drama films
Indian black-and-white films
1940s Bengali-language films
Films scored by Timir Baran
Films scored by Rabindranath Tagore